Holderbank railway station is a railway station in the municipality of Holderbank, in the Swiss canton of Aargau. It is an intermediate stop on the Baden–Aarau line.

Services 
The following services stop at Holderbank:

 Aargau S-Bahn: : half-hourly service between Aarau and Turgi, with every other train continuing from Aarau to Sursee.

References

External links 
 
 

Railway stations in the canton of Aargau
Swiss Federal Railways stations